Blue Ribbon Downs was an American horse racing track located in Sallisaw, Sequoyah County, Oklahoma. The facility hosted American Quarter Horse, and Thoroughbred flat racing events until it closed permanently in 2009.

History

Blue Ribbon Downs started when Bill Hedge bought 102 acres just west of Sallisaw in 1960. The track soon became known as a proving ground and gained recognition from the American Quarter Horse Association in 1963. Hedge sold the track to an investment group in 1973.it permanently closed in 2009.and the grandstands we're demolished in 2022. only the track and barns remain as a training facility.

Parimutuel wagering

In 1982, Oklahoma voters approved pari-mutuel betting and the first pari-mutuel race at Blue Ribbon Downs occurred August 30, 1984, before twelve thousand spectators in a sweltering temperature above 100 degrees. The advent of legal gambling at the track caused a local construction boom with motels, restaurants, and other businesses locating near the track.

Bankruptcy

Over time, the popularity of gambling on horse racing waned and the track struggled financially with several owners, filing bankruptcy in 1997 and again in 2002. In 2003 the Cherokee Nation bought Blue Ribbon Downs and infused it with capital. In 2005 the new owners converted it to a "racino," a combination horse racetrack and casino. The track continued to struggle, and closed permanently after their races on November 28, 2009.

References

External links
Blue Ribbon Downs To Open Jan. 24, Thanks to Rent, Law
City initiates foreclosure on Blue Ribbon

Defunct horse racing venues in the United States
1963 establishments in Oklahoma
2010 disestablishments in Oklahoma